Irenidora is a genus of moths in the family Gelechiidae. It contains the species Irenidora serenisca, which is found in China (Yunnan).

References

Gelechiinae